The 2022 Eisenhower Trophy took place 31 August – 3 September at Le Golf National and Golf de Saint-Nom-la-Bretèche south-west of Paris, France. It was the 32nd World Amateur Team Championship for the Eisenhower Trophy.

Defending champion was team Denmark.

Format 
The tournament was a 72-hole stroke play team event. Each team of three players played two rounds at Le Golf National and two rounds at Golf de Saint-Nom-la-Bretèche in different orders. The best placed teams played Golf National in the fourth round. The best two scores for each round counted towards the team total.

Venues

Course layout

Le Golf National (Albatros Course)

Golf de Saint-Nom-la-Bretèche (Red Course)

Teams
71 teams contested the event. Each team had three players.

Players in the leading teams

Results 
Leader after the first round was team Japan on 130. Japan was still leading after the second round on 264.

In the third round team Sweden advanced from tied eleventh, 13 strokes behind Japan, to take the lead with a 23-under-par score of 307, one stroke ahead of Italy, Japan and United States, all three of them tied second.

Italy won the championship with a total score of 31-under-par 541, one stroke ahead of Sweden.

Final team standings

Individual leaders

There was no official recognition for the lowest individual scores.

See also
 2022 Espirito Santo Trophy

References

External links

World Amateur Team Championships on International Golf Federation website

Eisenhower Trophy
Golf tournaments in France
Eisenhower Trophy
Eisenhower Trophy
Eisenhower Trophy
Eisenhower Trophy